Stephen Ward (born 1973), is a male former weightlifter who competed for England.

Weightlifting career
Ward represented England and won three silver medals in the 83 kg division, at the 1994 Commonwealth Games in Victoria. The three medals were won during an unusual period when three medals were awarded in one category (clean and jerk, snatch and combined) which invariably led to the same athlete winning all three of the same colour medal. Four years later he won a snatch gold medal and two silver medals for England, at the 1998 Commonwealth Games in Kuala Lumpur, Malaysia  and he also competed at the 2002 Commonwealth Games.

He also competed at the world championships, most recently at the 2001 World Weightlifting Championships.

References

Living people
1973 births
English male weightlifters
Commonwealth Games medallists in weightlifting
Commonwealth Games gold medallists for England
Commonwealth Games silver medallists for England
Weightlifters at the 1994 Commonwealth Games
Weightlifters at the 1998 Commonwealth Games
Weightlifters at the 2002 Commonwealth Games
Medallists at the 1994 Commonwealth Games
Medallists at the 1998 Commonwealth Games